Acrodipsas decima, the Decima ant-blue, is a butterfly of the family Lycaenidae. It is found in a small area of the Northern Territory in Australia.

The wingspan is about 20 mm.

External links
Australian Caterpillars

Acrodipsas
Butterflies of Australia
Butterflies described in 2004